Above the Rim is a 1994 American sports drama film co-written and directed by Jeff Pollack in his directorial debut. The screenplay was written by Barry Michael Cooper, adapted from a story by Benny Medina.

The film stars Duane Martin, Tupac Shakur, Leon and Marlon Wayans. Considered the conclusion to Cooper's "Harlem Trilogy" (the preceding films being New Jack City (1991) and Sugar Hill (1994), the film tells the story about a promising New York City high school basketball star and his relationships with a drug dealer and a former basketball star, now employed as a security guard at the high school he was a promising young star at years ago.

The film mostly took place in Harlem, with various scenes filmed at the Manhattan Center for Science and Mathematics in East Harlem. Some of the basketball scenes were filmed at Samuel J. Tilden High School in Brooklyn, New York.

Plot
Kyle-Lee Watson is a talented basketball player who is about to graduate from high school. While he waits to find out if he will receive a scholarship to Georgetown University, he finds himself in a difficult dilemma over a playground basketball tournament. He must decide whether to play for and follow his widely beloved basketball coach Mike Rollins and Birdie, a local drug dealer in the neighborhood. Thomas "Shep" Sheppard, a former standout player himself, now works as a high school security guard. Kyle feels resentment towards the security guard, because Kyle's own mother is falling in love with Shep.

Coincidentally, Kyle's coach also wants Shep to coach his team when he feels it is time for him to retire. It is later revealed to Kyle that Shep is Birdie's older brother. Kyle makes a decision to run with Birdie's team until he decided to come back to his old team, because of Birdie's wrongful actions against Flip and Kyle's friend Bugaloo. In the tournament, both Kyle's and Birdie's teams march to the finals, with Kyle's team playing solid team basketball, while Birdie's team plays a very rough & dirty style.

Before the finals, Birdie threatens Kyle, demanding Kyle to throw away the game, so that Birdie's team would win. Kyle is brutalized throughout the game, with Birdie's team having a solid lead. Shep, unable to watch any longer, joins Kyle's team. Despite being aggressively attacked throughout, Shep helps the team come back. In the final seconds, he passes the ball to Kyle, who dunks the ball and Kyle's team wins the game.

After the loss, Birdie orders Motaw, his star player and gang member, to kill Kyle. Shep protects Kyle by jumping on him and Motaw shoots Shep. A security guard then fatally shoots Motaw twice. At a club, Bugaloo walks near Birdie and shoots Birdie, killing him, as revenge for previous humiliations. In the end, Kyle is revealed to have gotten the scholarship to Georgetown University. During a televised game, Kyle hits the game winner, while a recovered Shep watches with a smile.

Cast
 Duane Martin as Kyle-Lee Watson, a talented basketball player who is determined to be accepted to Georgetown University, to play for their basketball team, the Hoyas. He is seen as cocky and hot tempered but later changes his ways during the course of the film. He is loosely based on Allen Iverson, who also went to Georgetown.
 Leon as Thomas "Shep" Sheppard, a quiet, bitter, introvert who used to be an incredible high school basketball player. He was later arrested after his best friend, Nutso, accidentally jumps off a high rise building while playing basketball.
 Tupac Shakur as Birdie, a local thug and Shep's younger brother.
 Bernie Mac as Flip, a homeless crackhead who played basketball in high school with Shep and Nutso. He is later killed by Birdie and Motaw.
 Tonya Pinkins as Mailika Watson, Kyle's mom who tries to get him to see that there is more to life than just basketball. She develops a relationship with Shep.
 Marlon Wayans as Bugaloo, Kyle's womanizing yet goofy best friend who spent a year in juvenile detention for an unknown crime. He is often bullied by Birdie and his gang members.
 David Bailey as Mike Rollins, a respected coach for Kyle's team, who tries to get Shep to play basketball again.
 Wood Harris as Motaw, Birdie's teenaged lieutenant and star player on his team. He is a homicidal psychopath who will threaten anyone with no second thought nor remorse.
 Shawn Michael Howard as Bobby, Kyle's shy and soft-spoken friend who plays in the basketball tournament.
 Henry Simmons II as Starnes, Kyle's teammate who is disgusted by Kyle's cockiness. 
 Michael Rispoli as Richard "Big Richie" Jones
 Bill Raftery as himself
 James Williams as Speedy
 John Thompson as himself

Soundtrack

Production
Filming for Above the Rim took place from October to November 1993, beginning on October 18 in Harlem, New York City. Allen Payne was the original choice to play Kyle Watson, but was rejected by Pollack in favor of Duane Martin. This was Tupac Shakur’s final theatrical film to be released during his lifetime before his death two years later in 1996.

Reception

Box office
The film was released on March 23, 1994, grossing $3,738,800 on opening weekend. At the end of its theatrical run, it had grossed a total of $16,192,320.

Awards
1995 MTV Movie Awards
 Best Movie Song: "Regulate" by Warren G (nominated)

Critical
It holds a 52% rating on Rotten Tomatoes, based on 21 reviews. Peter Travers stated "It's Shakur who steals the show. The rapper's offscreen legal problems are well known, but there's no denying his power as an actor."
Variety said "A fine cast and the movie's general energy can't overcome that mix of cliches and technical flaws, which should conspire to prevent any high flying at the box office."

See also
 Above the Rim (soundtrack)
 List of hood films

References

External links
 
 

1994 films
1990s teen drama films
1990s sports drama films
American basketball films
American coming-of-age drama films
American sports drama films
American teen drama films
1990s English-language films
Films set in Brooklyn
Films set in New York City
Hood films
African-American drama films
1990s hip hop films
1994 directorial debut films
1994 drama films
Films directed by Jeff Pollack
1990s American films